Ernest Marriott was a rugby union international who represented England in 1875.

Early life
He was born on 15 January 1857 in Salford, the son of Henry Marriott, Esq. Rowan Lodge, Whalley Range, Manchester. He attended Rugby School.

Rugby union career
Marriott made his international debut and only appearance for England on 13 December 1875 in the match against Ireland match at Rathmines, Dublin. In the only match he played for his national side he was on the winning side.

References

1857 births
English rugby union players
England international rugby union players
Rugby union forwards
People educated at Rugby School
Year of death missing
Rugby union players from Salford
Manchester Rugby Club players